The Catholic People's Party (KVP) was a Catholic Christian democratic political party in the Netherlands. The party was founded in 1945 as a continuation of the Roman Catholic State Party, which was a continuation of the General League of Roman Catholic Caucuses. During its entire existence, the party was in government. In 1977, a federation of parties including the Catholic People's Party, the Anti-Revolutionary Party (ARP) and the Christian Historical Union (CHU) ran together under the  Christian Democratic Appeal (CDA) banner. The three participating parties formally dissolved to form the CDA in 1980.

History

1945–1965 
The KVP was founded on 22 December 1945. It was a continuation of the pre-war Roman Catholic State Party (RKSP). Unlike the RKSP, the KVP was open to people of all denominations, but mainly Catholics supported the party. The party adopted a more progressive course and a more modern image than its predecessor.

In the elections of 1946 the party won a third of the vote, and joined the newly founded social democratic Labour Party (PvdA) to form a government coalition. This Roman/Red coalition (Roman (Rooms) for the Roman Catholic KVP, Rood, Red for the social democratic PvdA) lasted until 1958. In the first two years the KVP's Louis Beel led the Cabinet. Beel was not the party's leader a post which was taken by Carl Romme, who led the KVP between 1946 and 1961, from the House of Representatives. After the 1948 election the PvdA became larger and supplied the prime minister Willem Drees. The PvdA and the KVP were joined by combinations of the protestant-Christian Anti-Revolutionary Party (ARP) and Christian Historical Union (CHU) and the liberal People's Party for Freedom and Democracy (VVD) to form oversized cabinets, which often held a comfortable two-thirds majority. The cabinets were oriented at rebuilding the Dutch society and economy after the ravages of the Second World War and grant independence to the Dutch colony Indonesia. That last point was caused a split within the KVP, in 1948 a small group of Catholics broke away to form the Catholic National Party (KNP): it was opposed to the decolonisation of Indonesia and to cooperation between the Catholics and social-democrats. Under pressure of the Catholic Church the two parties united again in 1955.

The KVP was at the height of its power from 1958 to 1965. It was the dominant force in all cabinets, and every prime minister during this time was a party member. In 1958 the Fourth cabinet of Drees fell and Louis Beel formed an interim-cabinet with KVP, ARP and CHU. After the 1959 elections the KVP formed a centre-right cabinet with ARP, CHU and VVD, led by KVP member Jan de Quay. It continued to strengthen the welfare state. After the 1963 elections this cabinet was succeeded by a new cabinet of KVP-CHU-ARP-VVD, which was led by the KVP's Victor Marijnen. This coalition oversaw an economic boom. Norbert Schmelzer became the party's new leader, again operating within the House of Representatives and not the cabinet. A cabinet crisis over the Netherlands Public Broadcasting however caused the cabinet to fall in 1965. The KVP and ARP formed a cabinet with the PvdA, led by the KVP's Jo Cals. This cabinet also fell in the Night of Schmelzer, in which Norbert Schmelzer forced a cabinet crisis over the cabinet's financial policy. This was the first fall of cabinet, which was directly broadcast on television. An interim government of KVP and ARP was formed, led by the ARP's Jelle Zijlstra.

1965–1980 
The period 1965–1980 is period of decline, crisis and dissent for the KVP. The share of votes for the KVP began to decline after 1966, because of depillarisation and secularisation: There were fewer Catholics and Catholics no longer supported a Catholic party.

In the 1967 elections the KVP lost 15% of its votes and 8 seats. During the election campaign the KVP, ARP and CHU declared that they wanted to continue cooperating with each other. Cooperation with the PvdA was much less important. This led to unrest under young and left wing KVP supporters, including Ruud Lubbers, Jo Cals, Erik Jurgens and Jacques Aarden, who called themselves Christian Radicals. After the elections this promise was upheld and the KVP formed a cabinet with its old partners, led by Piet de Jong. After much debate some of the Christian Radicals broke away from the KVP in 1968 to form the Political Party of Radicals (PPR). These include three members of parliament, who form their own parliamentary party Groep Aarden. Lubbers and Cals stayed with the KVP. The new party became a close partner of the PvdA. In the 1971 elections the KVP lost another 7 seats (18% of its vote). The KVP again joined the ARP, CHU and VVD to form a new centre-right cabinet with rightwing dissenters of the PvdA, united in DS'70. The ARP's Barend Biesheuvel led the cabinet. In 1972 the cabinet fell because of internal problems of the junior partner, DS'70.

In the subsequent elections the KVP again lost eight seats, leaving only 27, 23 less than in 1963. The cabinet again lost its majority and the KVP saw no alternative than to cooperate with the PvdA and its allies PPR and D66. An extra-parliamentary cabinet is formed by PvdA, PPR and D66 joined by prominent progressives from KVP and ARP. The KVP's ministers include the minister of Justice Dries van Agt and the minister of the Economy Ruud Lubbers. The KVP does not officially support this cabinet, which is led by social democrat Joop den Uyl. This cabinet was characterised by infighting and fell just before the 1977 elections.

In the 1970s the KVP realised that if it wanted to continue it needed to find new ways of cooperating. Ideas to form a broad Christian democratic party, like the German Christian Democratic Union were brought into practice. In 1974 the three parties formed a federation, called Christian Democratic Appeal (CDA). In the 1977 elections the CDA won more seats than the KVP, ARP and CHU had together. After the elections, Dries van Agt became prime minister for the CDA. In 1980 the three parties officially dissolved themselves into the CDA.

The Catholics still constitute a powerful group within the CDA. Indeed, the CDA's first two prime ministers, van Agt  and Ruud Lubbers, came from the KVP side of the merger. In the early years a system of equal representation of Catholics and Protestants was practiced, from which the KVP as only Catholic group profited. Nowadays many CDA members, like Maxime Verhagen and Maria van der Hoeven have a background in the KVP's political Catholicism.

Name 
The name Catholic People's Party (Dutch: Katholieke Volkspartij; KVP), must be seen in contrast with the name of its predecessor Roman Catholic State Party. The party no longer uses the name "Roman Catholic", but simply "Catholic", de-emphasising its religious affiliation. It is no longer a state party, but a people's party, emphasising its progressive, democratic nature. The new name emphasises the KVP's progressive, democratic and non-denominational image.

Ideology and issues 
The KVP was a Christian democratic party, which based itself on the Bible and Catholic dogma.

As such it was a proponent of a mixed economy: A strong welfare state should be combined with a free market, with a corporatist organisation. Trade unions and employers' organisations were to negotiate on wages in a Social Economic Council and should make legislation for some economic sectors on themselves, without government intervention, in so called Productschappen.

The state should watch over the morality of the people: divorce should be limited, recreation should be moral (for instance different swimming hours for women and men) and the family should be preserved. Families were to be helped by fiscal policies, such as the "kinderbijslag", support by the government, by the newly set up Ministry of Culture, Recreation and Welfare, and the possibility to buy their own home.

Internationally, the KVP was a staunch proponent of European integration and cooperation with the NATO. The party sought the middle ground in the issue of decolonisation: Indonesia and Suriname should be independent countries within a Dutch Commonwealth.

Electoral performance

Municipal and provincial government 

The party was particularly strong in the southern provinces of Limburg and North Brabant, where it often held 90% of the seats in the provincial and municipal legislatures and supplied all provincial and municipal governments, provincial governors and mayors. In regions like Twente, West Friesland and Zeelandic Flanders it held similar positions in municipalities, but cooperated with other parties on the provincial level.

Organisation

Leaders

 Chairs
 Piet Witteman (22 December 1945 – 4 April 1946)
 Jan Andriessen (4 April 1946 – 30 May 1953)
 Harry van Doorn (30 May 1953 – 23 June 1962)
 Piet Aalberse Jr. (23 June 1962 – 30 March 1968)
 Fons van der Stee (30 March 1968 – 14 July 1971)
 Dick de Zeeuw (14 July 1971 – 20 June 1975)
 Wim Vergeer (20 June 1975 – 27 September 1980)

 Lijsttrekker – General election
 Carl Romme – 1946, 1948, 1952, 1956, 1959
 Wim de Kort – 1963
 Norbert Schmelzer – 1967
 Gerard Veringa – 1971
 Frans Andriessen – 1972

 Parliamentary leaders in the House of Representatives
 Carl Romme (4 June 1946 – 25 October 1960)
 Jan Andriessen (25 October 1960 – 19 September 1961)
 Wim de Kort (19 September 1961 – 7 December 1963)
 Norbert Schmelzer (7 December 1963 – 28 April 1971)
 Piet Engels (28 April 1971 – 11 May 1971)
 Gerard Veringa (11 May 1971 – 16 August 1971)
 Frans Andriessen (16 August 1971 – 25 May 1977)

 Parliamentary leaders in the Senate
 Jan van de Mortel (22 December 1945 – 23 July 1946)
 Cor Kropman (23 July 1946 – 5 June 1963)
 Harry van Lieshout (1 October 1963 – 7 October 1969)
 Jan Niers (7 October 1969 – 11 May 1971)
 Piet de Jong (11 May 1971 – 17 September 1974)
 Jan Teijssen (17 September 1974 – 20 September 1977)

 Prime Ministers
 Louis Beel (3 July 1946 – 7 August 1948, 22 December 1958 – 19 May 1959)
 Jan de Quay (19 May 1959 – 24 July 1963)
 Victor Marijnen (24 July 1963 – 14 April 1965)
 Jo Cals (14 April 1965 – 22 November 1966)
 Piet de Jong (5 April 1967 – 6 July 1971)

Electorate 
The KVP was supported by Catholics of all classes. Its strength was in the Catholic south of the Netherlands: North Brabant and Limburg, where it often obtained more than 90% of vote. It was also strong in Catholic regions like Twente, West Friesland and Zeelandic Flanders.

During the 1960s and 1970s the KVP lost part of its electorate to progressive parties like the PPR, the PvdA and D66.

Organisation

Linked organisations 
The KVP had an own youth organisation, the Catholic People's Party Youth Groups (Dutch: Katholieke Volkspartij Jongeren Groupen; KVPJG) and a scientific foundation: the Centre for Political Formation.

International organisations 
In the European Parliament the KVP's members sat in the Christian Democratic group.

Pillarised organisations 
The KVP had close links to many other Catholic institutions such as the Catholic Church and together they formed the Catholic pillar. These organisations included the Catholic Labour Union NKV, the Catholic Employers Organisation KNOV, the Catholic Farmers' Organisation KNBLTB, Catholic Hospitals united in the Yellow-White Cross and Catholic Schools. The Catholic Broadcasting Association KRO and the Catholic Paper De Volkskrant were the voices of the KVP.

Relationships to other parties 

As a Christian party, the KVP had strong ties with the conservative Protestant ARP and Christian Historical Union. The strong ties resulted in several cabinets in the period 1946-1977 and the formation of the Christian Democratic Appeal, in which the three parties united in 1974.

The KVP had a strong centre-left group within its ranks. These supported closer cooperation with the social democratic PvdA. This resulted in several cabinets with the PvdA, but also splits within the party, most notably the formation of the Political Party of Radicals

As noted by one study, in the early postwar years “the Catholic party was dominated by its left wing, with the result that the PvdA and the KVP had relatively few disagreements on policy issues.” Beginning in 1952 however, “the focus of power within the KVP shifted to the right, resulting in frequent conflcits within the cabinet, especially in the area of economic and social policy.”

International comparison 
As the party of a Catholic minority in a dominantly Protestant country, the KVP is comparable to the German Centre Party, which existed before the Second World War and the Christian Democratic People's Party of Switzerland. Its political position and agenda are similar to other catholic Christian democratic parties in Europe, such as the Flemish Christen-Democratisch en Vlaams party and the Italian Christian Democracy.

References

Further reading 
 Electoral Stability and Electoral Change: The Case of Dutch Catholics by Herman Bakvis in: Canadian Journal of Political Science Vol. 14, No. 3 (Sep., 1981), pp. 519–555
 
 Changing Procedures and Changing Strategies in Dutch Coalition Building by Hans Daalder In: Legislative Studies Quarterly Vol. 11, No. 4 (Nov., 1986), pp. 507–531
 Conservatism in the Netherlands by Hermann von der Dunk In: Journal of Contemporary History, Vol. 13, No. 4 (Oct., 1978), pp. 741–763

Catholic political parties
Defunct political parties in the Netherlands
Confessional parties in the Netherlands
Political parties established in 1945
Political parties disestablished in 1980
Defunct Christian political parties
1945 establishments in the Netherlands
1980 disestablishments in the Netherlands